Krishna Garadi is a 1986 Indian Telugu film starring Krishna in two different roles alongside Jaya Prada, Kaikala Satyanarayana and Rao Gopala Rao in the key roles. Scripted and directed by Vijaya Bapineedu, the film had musical score by Chakravarthy. The film released on 3 January is the first release for actor Krishna in the year, 1986.

Cast 
 Krishna Ghattamaneni as Krishna
 Jaya Prada as Chittemma
 Kaikala Satyanarayana as Narayana
 Rao Gopala Rao as Idea Appa Rao
 Jaggayya as Bahadur
 Nutan Prasad
 Sowcar Janaki
 Jayamalini
Mada as Devadasu
Potti Prasad as Ramadasu
Anuradha
Balaji
Poornima
Allu Ramalingaiah
P.J. Sarma

Songs

Release and Reception 
The film was released on 3 January 1986.

References

External links 

1986 films
1980s Telugu-language films